Dossier Journal is an independently published and owned bi-annual arts and culture journal. Content draws upon a wide range of subjects, including fashion features, art and photography portfolios, fiction, poetry, critical essays, interviews, recipes, crossword puzzles, articles on film, architecture, music and culinary pursuits.

Dossierjournal.com is an extension of the print magazine, providing a forum for both established and emerging artists to exhibit their work online. Dossierjournal.com has the latest information about retail stores, restaurants, galleries, concerts, book signings and events in New York and cities all over the world.

Dossier announced plans to open a concept store in April 2009 on DeKalb Avenue in Brooklyn, New York.

Contributors
Contributors have included Sherman Alexie, Jonathan Ames, David Armstrong, Mario Batali, Matthew Dickman, Jennifer Egan, Nan Goldin, Kim Gordon, Rachel Maddow, Michael McKimm, Asako Narahashi, Yiyun Li, Michael Pollan, Robert Longo, Pamela Love, Zac Posen, Collier Schorr, Tom Sleigh, Alice Waters and Francesca Woodman.

References

External links
 Official website

Visual arts magazines published in the United States
Fashion magazines published in the United States
Independent magazines
Magazines established in 2008